

Donuts EP: J. Rocc's Picks is an EP released by Stones Throw following the 2006 death of Detroit producer/rapper J Dilla. The follow-up to his Donuts album, this EP features tracks picked by J. Rocc, a fellow producer on Stones Throw. The tracks on the EP are extended versions of the original tracks from Donuts, with the exception of "Signs", which is not included on the original album.

Track listing
All tracks written by J. Yancey.

Side A

Side B

References

Instrumental hip hop albums
J Dilla EPs
Albums produced by J Dilla
2006 EPs
Stones Throw Records EPs